is a Japanese voice actress and singer. She is affiliated with Voice Kit. Among her most popular roles is Eli Ayase from Love Live! School Idol Project series. She became the lead singer of the Japanese pop and trance duo fripSide in 2009 until she announced in October 2021 her retirement from the music duo. Her nickname is Nanjolno.

Biography 
Nanjō's music career began in 2009 when she replaced the singer Nao as the lead singer of the band fripSide. Her first song as a member of the band was "Only My Railgun", which was used as the opening theme to the anime television series A Certain Scientific Railgun. In 2010, she was cast in the Love Live! franchise as Eli Ayase, a member of the fictional idol group μ's, as well as a member of its sub-unit BiBi. She released her first mini-album "Katarumoa" on December 12, 2012. She released her first solo single  on November 27, 2013; the title song is used as the first ending theme to the 2013 anime television series Tokyo Ravens. In 2015, she together with the other voice actresses of Love Live!, received the Best Singing Award at the 9th Seiyu Awards for best musical performance group. Meanwhile at the 13th Seiyu Awards, Nanjo won the Influencer Award, she was the first recipient of the award as it was introduced in that year. She released a new album titled  on July 25, 2016. She released a new album titled THE MEMORIES APARTMENT -Anime- which featured all of her singles to date and six covers and also THE MEMORIES APARTMENT -Original- in which fans voted for their favourite song of Nanjo’s from her entire discography (singles and covers excluded) simultaneously on July 18, 2018.

Discography

Singles

Albums

Studio albums

Mini albums

Best albums

Live albums

Acoustic albums

Filmography

Anime
2006
Soul Link as Aya Sugimoto
Tsuyokiss Cool×Sweet as Honoka Konoe
Hanoka as Mika Kisaragi

2007
Da Capo II as Koko Tsukishima

2008
Da Capo II Second Season as Koko Tsukishima

2009
Weiß Survive as Cal
CANAAN as Maria Oosawa
Modern Magic Made Simple as Student (ep 2)
A Certain Scientific Railgun as Maaya Awatsuki
Weiß Survive R as Cal
Katekyo Hitman Reborn! as Yuni

2010
Baka to Test to Shokanju as Aiko Kudō
Tantei Opera Milky Holmes as Kokoro Akechi

2011
Cardfight!! Vanguard as Rekka Tatsunagi
Hourou Musuko as Kanako Sasa
Hanasaku Iroha as Namiko Igarashi
Hoshizora e Kakaru Hashi as Young Hajime Nakatsugawa
The Qwaser of Stigmata II as Tsubasa Amano
Morita-san wa Mukuchi as Hana Matsuzaka
Baka to Test to Shokanju Ni as Aiko Kudō
Nekogami Yaoyorozu as Haruka, Kyōko Daimonji
Maken-ki! as Otohime Yamato

2012
Recorder and Randsell as Tetsuya
Tantei Opera Milky Holmes Dai-Ni-Maku as Kokoro Akechi
Bodacious Space Pirates as Yayoi Yoshitomi
Another as Sayuri Kakinuma
Recorder and Randsell Re as Tetsuya
Shirokuma Cafe as Nursery School Teacher (ep 17)
Cardfight!! Vanguard: Asia Circuit Hen as Rekka Tatsunagi
Tari Tari as Akiko Okuto
Upotte!! as 88(SR-88A)
Joshiraku as Gankyō Kūrubiyūtei
Robotics;Notes as Akiho Senomiya

2013
D.C.III: Da Capo III as Edward Watson
Cardfight!! Vanguard: Link Joker Hen as Rekka Tatsunagi
Minami-ke Tadaima as Miyuki
Love Live! as Eli Ayase
A Certain Scientific Railgun S as Maaya Awatsuki
Recorder and Randsell Mi as Tetsuya
Senki Zesshō Symphogear G as Shirabe Tsukuyomi
Futari wa Milky Holmes as Kokoro Akechi

2014
The Pilot's Love Song as Nanako Hanasaki
Cardfight!! Vanguard: Legion Mate Hen as Rekka Tatsunagi
Riddle Story of Devil as Nio Hashiri
Love Live! Season 2 as Eli Ayase
Magica Wars as Matsuri Sengen
PriPara as Nao Ehime, Nanami Shiroi, Nene Tokuda

2015
Classroom Crisis as Subaru Yamaki
Senki Zesshō Symphogear GX as Shirabe Tsukuyomi
Tantei Kageki Milky Holmes TD as Kokoro Akechi
Panpaka Pants as Panpaka

2016
And you thought there is never a girl online? as Yui Saitō / Nekohime
Schwarzesmarken  as Lise Hohenstein
Tama and Friends as Momo
Quiz Tokiko-san as Tokiko

2017
Clockwork Planet as Naoto Miura
Battle Girl High School as Renge Serizawa
Atom: The Beginning as Maria
Senki Zesshō Symphogear AXZ as Shirabe Tsukuyomi
Berserk as Sonia
Neko no Robu as Robu
Makeruna!! Aku no Gundan! as Narrator (Episode 8)

2018
Dances with the Dragons as Curaso Opt Koga
Killing Bites as Seira Son
Rilu Rilu Fairilu as Gardenia
Hakyuu Houshin Engi as Ko Kibi
Isekai Izakaya "Nobu" as Hildegard
Karakuri Circus as Liang Ming-Xia

2019
My Roommate Is a Cat as Haru Akimoto
King of Prism: Shiny Seven Stars as Tsubasa Takahashi
Senki Zesshō Symphogear XV as Shirabe Tsukuyomi

2020
Yatogame-chan Kansatsu Nikki 2 Satsume as Lala Shonai
Hatena Illusion as Maeve Hoshisato
A Certain Scientific Railgun T as Maaya Awatsuki
Lapis Re:Lights as Chloe
King's Raid: Successors of the Will as Lupine

2021
Yatogame-chan Kansatsu Nikki 3 Satsume as Lala Shonai
The Fruit of Evolution as Karen Kannazuki

2022
Yatogame-chan Kansatsu Nikki 4 Satsume as Lala Shonai
Hanabi-chan Is Often Late as Condor Tsubasa Isogami

2023
A Herbivorous Dragon of 5,000 Years Gets Unfairly Villainized as Ryatt (Japanese dub)
Don't Toy with Me, Miss Nagatoro 2nd Attack as Nagatoro's sister
The Aristocrat's Otherworldly Adventure: Serving Gods Who Go Too Far as Cain

Animated films
2013
 A Certain Magical Index: The Movie – The Miracle of Endymion as Maaya Awatsuki

2014
 Cardfight!! Vanguard: The Movie as Rekka Tatsunagi
 Panpaka Pants The Movie: Treasure of the Bananan Kingdom as Panpaka

2015
 Love Live! The School Idol Movie as Eli Ayase

2016
 PriPara Minna no Akogare Let's Go PriPari as Nao Ehime, Nanami Shirai
 Tantei Opera Milky Holmes the Movie: Milky Holmes' Counterattack as Kokoro Akechi

2017
 Trinity Seven the Movie: The Eternal Library and the Alchemist Girl as Master Akarsha
 PriPara: Mi~nna de Kagayake! Kirarin Star Live as Nao Ehime

2019
 Grisaia: Phantom Trigger the Animation as Maki
 King of Prism: Shiny Seven Stars as Tsubasa Takahashi

OVA/ONA
Ah! My Goddess: Itsumo Futari De as Eiru, Saaga
Baby Princess 3D Paradise 0 [Love] as Sakura
Morita-san wa Mukuchi as Hana Matsuzaka
Penguin Girl as Nene Kurio
A Certain Scientific Railgun as Maaya Awatsuki
Love Live! School Idol Project OVA as Eli Ayase
Pole Princess!! as Yukari Mikoshiro

Video games
2006
Ar tonelico: Melody of Elemia as Krusche Elendia, Tastiella de Lu
Soul Link EXTENSION as Aya Sugimoto

2007
The Bincho-tan Shiawase-goyomi as Additional Voice

2009
Little Anchor as Chloe Anderson
Canvas 3: Tanshoku no Pastel as Renka Yamabuki

2010
Ar tonelico Qoga: Knell of Ar Ciel as Krusche Elendia
fortissimo//Akkord:Bsusvier as Sakura
Tales of Graces f as Little Queen
Tantei Opera Milky Holmes as Kokoro Akechi

2011
Otome wa Boku ni Koishiteru ~ Futari no Elder as Awayuki Reizei

2012
Soulcalibur V as Leixia
Da Capo III as Koko Tsukishima
Robotics;Notes as Akiho Senomiya

2013
The Guided Fate Paradox as Lanael Shiratori (Credited as "Eli Ayase")
Love Live! School Idol Festival – Eli Ayase

2014
Aiyoku no Eustia as Eustia Astraea
Hyperdevotion Noire: Goddess Black Heart as Ryūka
Love Live! School Idol Paradise as Eli Ayase
Magica Wars as Matsuri Sengen

2015
Battle Girl High School as Renge Serizawa
Tokyo Mirage Sessions ♯FE – Kiria Kurono 
Final Fantasy XIV: Heavensward – Krile Mayer Baldesion
Stella Glow – Lisette
Dream Girlfriend

2017
Final Fantasy XIV: Stormblood – Krile Mayer Baldesion, Suzaku
Senki Zesshou Symphogear XD Unlimited – Shirabe Tsukuyomi

2018
Magia Record – Suzune Amano
Final Fantasy Brave Exvius – Citra
Higurashi When They Cry Hō – Tamura Hime no Mikoto

2019
Robotics;Notes DaSH - Akiho Senomiya
Valiant Force – Theia Alexander
Final Fantasy XIV: Shadowbringers – Krile Mayer Baldesion, Lyna
Granblue Fantasy – Eli Ayase, Tikoh
Love Live! School Idol Festival All Stars – Eli Ayase

2020
Tokyo Mirage Sessions#FE ENCORE – Kiria Kurono
Trials of Mana – Isabella / Belladonna
Fire Emblem Heroes – Kiria Kurono
Onmyouji – Kinnara 
Higurashi When They Cry Mei – Tamura Hime no Mikoto
Lord of Heroes – Lyn

2021
 Final Fantasy XIV: Endwalker – Krile Mayer Baldesion

2022
 The Tale of Onogoro – Haru Kose
Alchemy Stars – Sanae

Live-action Film
Brave Father Online: Our Story of Final Fantasy XIV (2019)

Dubbing roles

Live-action
East of Eden – Lee Ki-soon (Jeon So-min)
Roman Holiday (New Era Movies Edition) – Princess Ann (Audrey Hepburn)

Animation
The Grinch – Blonde Who
The Secret Life of Pets 2 – Princess

References

External links
 
 
Official agency profile 

1984 births
Living people
Anime singers
Japanese video game actresses
Japanese voice actresses
Μ's members
Musicians from Shizuoka Prefecture
NBCUniversal Entertainment Japan artists
Voice actresses from Shizuoka Prefecture
21st-century Japanese actresses
21st-century Japanese singers
21st-century Japanese women singers